Pamphilius sylvarum is a species of insect belonging to the family Pamphilidae.

It is native to Western Europe.

References

Sawflies